Vito J. Titone (July 5, 1929 – July 6, 2005) was an American judge who served as an Associate Judge of the New York Court of Appeals from 1985 to 1998.

Titone was known as a liberal lion of the state's highest court. One of his most notable decisions was the majority opinion in Braschi v. Stahl, which recognized for the first time that a gay couple could be considered a family under the law. 

Born in Brooklyn, New York, and raised in Queens, Titone received his law degree from St. John's University School of Law, where he was a classmate and close friend with future Governor Mario Cuomo, who later appointed Titone to the Court of Appeals. He died on July 6, 2005, in Staten Island, New York City, New York at age 76.

References

1929 births
2005 deaths
Judges of the New York Court of Appeals
New York (state) Democrats
People from Brooklyn
St. John's University (New York City) alumni
20th-century American judges